Heros Peninsula is the partly ice-free 8.9 km wide peninsula projecting from Foyn Coast, Antarctic Peninsula 13 km southeastwards into Cabinet Inlet.  It ends in Spur Point to the southeast.

The feature is named after the Thracian god Heros (the Thracian Rider).

Location
British mapping in 1974.

Maps
 British Antarctic Territory: Graham Land.  Scale 1:250000 topographic map.  BAS 250 Series, Sheet SQ 19–20.  London, 1974.
 Antarctic Digital Database (ADD). Scale 1:250000 topographic map of Antarctica. Scientific Committee on Antarctic Research (SCAR). Since 1993, regularly upgraded and updated.

References
 Heros Peninsula. SCAR Composite Antarctic Gazetteer.
 Bulgarian Antarctic Gazetteer. Antarctic Place-names Commission. (details in Bulgarian, basic data in English)

External links
 Heros Peninsula. Copernix satellite image

Peninsulas of Graham Land
Foyn Coast
Bulgaria and the Antarctic